Blue enigma can refer to:
 a cultivar of Salvia guaranitica